Thazhakudy is a panchayat town in Kanniyakumari district in the Indian state of Tamil Nadu. This village is situated between 2 rivers "Puthanaar" and "Palaiyaar".  There are also few temples in and around Thazhakudy. Avvaiyar Amman temple is one among them 
which is 2 km towards East from Thazhakudy.

Demographics
 India census, Thazhakudy had a population of 8531. Males constitute 50% of the population and females 50%. Thazhakudy has an average literacy rate of 78%, higher than the national average of 59.5%: male literacy is 81%, and female literacy is 74%. In Thazhakudy, 10% of the population is under 6 years of age. The village is 9 km away from nagercoil.

References

Cities and towns in Kanyakumari district